The Gulf Coastal Lowlands is a geomorphological province in Florida. The province extends along the coast of the Gulf of Mexico from the western end of the Florida Panhandle to near Ft. Myers in southern Florida. The average width of the province is 40 km. It is the largest geomorphological province in Florida. Due to its low elevation, the province was at sea level during warmer periods of the Pliocene and Pleistocene, and features such as ancient dunes and sand bars are found far inland.

The Gulf Coastal Lowlands include lagoons, barrier islands, coastal swamps and marshes and drowned coastal karst (Big Bend Coast) along the coast. Features of the Gulf Coastal Lowlands include the Desoto Plain, Wakulla Hills, Woodville Karst Plain, Tates Hell Swamp, Lake Munson Hills, Beacon Slope, Fountain Slope and Greenhead Slope.

Notes

References

Geology of Florida